Nicholas Chad Gordon (born October 24, 1995) is an American professional baseball infielder and outfielder for the Minnesota Twins of Major League Baseball (MLB). He was selected by the Twins in the first round of the 2014 Major League Baseball draft.

High school career
Gordon attended Olympia High School in Orlando, Florida. As a junior in 2013, he was the Florida Gatorade Baseball Player of the Year. He hit .505 with two home runs and 30 runs batted in as a batter and as a pitcher he was 5–1 with a 0.78 earned run average (ERA), 44 strikeouts and five saves in  innings pitched. As a senior, he batted .512 with 6 home runs and 28 RBIs in 28 games, leading his team to the Class 8A regional semifinals. He signed a letter of intent to play baseball at Florida State University.

Professional career
Gordon was considered one of the top prospects for the 2014 Major League Baseball draft. He was selected as the fifth overall pick in the first round by the Minnesota Twins. He signed with the Twins on June 9, receiving a $3.851 million signing bonus. He was assigned to the Elizabethton Twins where he batted .294 with one home run and 28 RBIs. He spent 2015 with the Cedar Rapids Kernels where he posted a .277 batting average with one home run, 58 RBIs, and 25 stolen bases. In 2016, he played for the Fort Myers Miracle, where, in 116 games, he batted .291 with three home runs and 52 RBIs. Gordon spent 2017 with the Chattanooga Lookouts where he batted .270 with a career high nine home runs and 66 RBIs. Gordon began the 2018 season with Chattanooga, hitting .333 over 42 games, before being promoted to the AAA Rochester Red Wings, where he hit .212 with two home runs and 29 RBI in 99 games.

The Twins added Gordon to their 40-man roster after the 2018 season. He was assigned to Rochester at the end of spring training. For the 2019 season he was limited to 70 games due to injury but played well, carrying a slash line of .298/.342/.459 in 319 plate appearances. Prior to the start of the 2020 season, Gordon tested positive for COVID-19.

On April 23, 2021, Gordon was promoted to the major leagues for the first time. On April 26, Gordon was optioned to the alternate training site without making a major league appearance. On May 3, Gordon was recalled to the active roster. He made his MLB debut on May 6 as the starting second baseman against the Texas Rangers. In the game, he registered his first stolen base and his first major league hit, a single off of Rangers starter Jordan Lyles. On June 4, Gordon hit his first major league home run, a solo shot off of Kansas City Royals reliever Wade Davis. On August 5, Gordon was optioned down to AAA St. Paul Saints to make room for Rob Refsnyder, who had been taken off the 10-day injured list.

Personal life
His father, Tom Gordon, played in the major leagues from 1988 to 2009. His paternal half-brother, Dee Strange-Gordon, is also a major league player.

References

External links

1995 births
Living people
Baseball players from Orlando, Florida
Major League Baseball infielders
Minnesota Twins players
Elizabethton Twins players
Cedar Rapids Kernels players
Fort Myers Miracle players
Surprise Saguaros players
Chattanooga Lookouts players
Rochester Red Wings players